Benut-e Pain (also Romanized as Benūt-e Pā‘īn; also known as Bannut, Benūt, Bunūt, and Shahrak-e Benūt-e Soflá) is a village in Choghamish Rural District, Choghamish District, Dezful County, Khuzestan Province, Iran. At the  census, its population was 440, in 89 families.

References 

Populated places in Dezful County